MuseWeb (formerly Museums and the Web) is an annual international conference in the field of museums and their websites. It was founded and organized by Archives & Museum Informatics and has taken place each spring since 1997 in North America, along with events in other countries.

Since 2011 it has been organized by Museums and the Web LLC and Co-Chaired by Nancy Proctor and Rich Cherry, who also co-edit the proceedings.

Overview
The conference includes the GLAMi awards(The Galleries, Libraries, Archives, and Museums Innovation awards) which recognizes the best GLAM work in the sector. Projects are nominated by GLAM professionals from around the world and reviewed by a committee of peers. The conference previously included annual "Best of the Web awards" for museum-related websites in a number of different categories, as well as an overall winner.

Individual conferences
The following events have been held or are planned:

 MW1997, March 16–19, 1997 — Los Angeles, California, USA
 MW1998, April 22–25, 1998 — Toronto, Ontario, Canada
 MW1999, March 11–14, 1999 — New Orleans, Louisiana, USA
 MW2000, April 16–19, 2000 — Minneapolis, Minnesota, USA
 MW2001, March 14–17, 2001 — Seattle, Washington, USA
 MW2002, April 17–20, 2002 — Boston, Massachusetts, USA
 MW2003, March 19–22, 2003 — Charlotte, North Carolina, USA
 MW2004, March 31 – April 3, 2004 — Arlington, Virginia / Washington DC, USA
 MW2005, April 13–17, 2005 — Vancouver, British Columbia, Canada
 MW2006, March 22–25, 2006 — Albuquerque, New Mexico, USA
 MW2007, April 11–14, 2007 — San Francisco, California, USA
 MW2008, April 8–12, 2008 — Montreal, Quebec, Canada
 MW2009, April 14–18, 2009 — Indianapolis, Indiana, USA
 MW2010, April 13–17, 2010 — Denver, Colorado, USA
 MW2011, April 6–9, 2011 — Philadelphia, Pennsylvania, USA
 MW2012, April 11–14, 2012 — San Diego, California, USA
 MW2013, April 17–20, 2013 — Portland, Oregon, USA 
 MWA2013, December 9–12, 2013 — Hong Kong
 MWF2014, February 19–21, 2014 — Florence, Italy
 MW2014, April 2–5, 2014  — Baltimore, Maryland, USA 
 MWA2014, October 7–10, 2014 —  Daejeon & Seoul, South Korea
 MW2015, April 8–11, 2015  — Chicago, Illinois, USA 
 MWA2015, October 5–9, 2015 — Melbourne, Australia
 MW2016, April 6–9, 2016 — Los Angeles, California, USA 
 MW17, April 19–22, 2017 — Cleveland, Ohio, USA 
 MW18, April 18–21, 2018 — Vancouver, British Columbia, Canada 
 MW19, April 2–6, 2019 — Boston, Massachusetts, USA 
 MW20, March 31-April 4, 2020 — This event was scheduled to take place in Los Angeles, California, but due to the COVID-19 pandemic it was held virtually
MW21, April 5–9, 2021 — Washington DC, USA

See also
 ICHIM (International Cultural Heritage Informatics Meeting)
 EVA Conferences
 Best of the Web awards

References

External links
 

Museum events
Museum informatics
Virtual museums
Web-related conferences
Computer-related introductions in 1997
Recurring events established in 1997
March events
April events
International conferences